The 2015 5-hour Energy 301 was a NASCAR Sprint Cup Series race held on July 19, 2015 at New Hampshire Motor Speedway in Loudon, New Hampshire. Contested over 301 laps on the 1.058 mile (1.703 km) speedway, it was the 19th race of the 2015 NASCAR Sprint Cup Series season. Kyle Busch won the race, his third of the season. Brad Keselowski finished second while Kevin Harvick, Joey Logano and Dale Earnhardt Jr. rounded out the top five.

Carl Edwards won the pole for the race and led 19 laps on his way to a seventh-place finish. Brad Keselowski led a race high of 100 laps on his way to a runner-up finish. The race had nine lead changes among seven different drivers, as well as seven caution flag periods for 34 laps.

This was the 32nd career victory for Kyle Busch, his third of the 2015 season, second consecutive race win, second at New Hampshire Motor Speedway and seventh at the track for Joe Gibbs Racing. This win moved Busch up to 33rd in the points standings, 58 behind David Gilliland for the 30th place Chase cutoff and 487 behind points leader Kevin Harvick. Despite being the winning manufacturer, Toyota left Loudon trailing Chevrolet by 84 points in the manufacture standings.

The 5-hour Energy 301 was carried by NBC Sports on the cable/satellite NBCSN network for the American television audience. The radio broadcast for the race was carried by the Performance Racing Network on Sirius XM NASCAR Radio.

Report

Background

New Hampshire Motor Speedway is a  oval speedway located in Loudon, New Hampshire which has hosted NASCAR racing annually since the early 1990s, as well as an IndyCar weekend and the oldest motorcycle race in North America, the Loudon Classic.  Nicknamed "The Magic Mile", the speedway is often converted into a  road course, which includes much of the oval.

The track was originally the site of Bryar Motorsports Park before being purchased and redeveloped by Bob Bahre. The track is currently one of eight major NASCAR tracks owned and operated by Speedway Motorsports.

Kevin Harvick entered New Hampshire with a 68-point lead over Jimmie Johnson and Joey Logano. Dale Earnhardt Jr. entered 76 back and Martin Truex Jr. entered 96 back.

The 2015 5-hour Energy 301 marked the first NASCAR Sprint Cup race after the passing of Formula One driver Jules Bianchi on 18 July 2015, who had crashed at the Japanese Grand Prix and remained in a coma for the preceding nine months. Several drivers and team owners paid tribute to Bianchi, many of them in form of messages written on helmets and cars. A minute of silence was held before the race start on Sunday in commemoration of the Frenchman. The drivers and members of the Bianchi family (parents and siblings) linked in a chain arm in arm, with their helmets surrounding Jules' in the middle.

Entry list
The entry list for the 5-hour Energy 301 was released on Monday, July 13 at 11:42 a.m. Eastern time. Forty-four cars were entered for the race. All 44 were entered for the previous week's Quaker State 400. The driver changes for this week's race included Eddie MacDonald in the No. 32 Go FAS Racing Ford, Derek White attempted to make his first career Sprint Cup Series start in the No. 33 Hillman-Circle Sport LLC Chevrolet, Reed Sorenson in the No. 62 Premium Motorsports Chevrolet and Timmy Hill in the No. 98 Premium Motorsports Ford.

First practice

Qualifying

"I’ve struggled at this racetrack so this is big for me," Edwards said. "We need to get another win." "We hope we’ll keep this speed on race day," said Connecticut native Joey Logano after qualifying second. "We all know how special Loudon is to me, to try to make something happen here, so it’s nice to know we’ve got a fast racecar. It’s good in race trim, as well. We weren’t very good in qualifying trim in practice. We changed a lot of things and lit it up a little bit" "It's not been a good day for us," said three-time New Hampshire winner Jeff Gordon after qualifying 23rd. "We've been struggling. It's disappointing we didn't qualify better."

Qualifying results

Practice (post-qualifying)

Second practice
In the closing minutes of the session, Clint Bowyer collided with Jeff Gordon just as Gordon was backing out of his garage stall. “You can’t see out of the pit stall,” Bowyer told Motorsport.com. “He just came out and I was a comin’. That poor ol’ boy that was backing him out, I bet he feels like (crap). But you know, it’s a wonder it don’t happen more often. To be honest with you, I was pulling out of my stall, I went to come back out and the guy never moved. I was like, ‘whoa, whoa, whoa.’ But it’s so tight in here. You hate to see that, but damn, especially with the 24 (laughs) and everything we have going on. It didn’t seem to hurt our car too bad. It hurt his bad — it hit in a bad spot. But that’s why we have guys that back us up.” “Hopefully all this hard work and stuff we’re going through will pay off tomorrow," said Gordon, who will start 23rd. "We’ve got a pit cart over there that kind of blocks what you can see of the back of my car backing out there. The guy that backs me out looked over, guess he was just starting to back me out; and I crept out there and he cleared me, but the No. 15 (Bowyer), probably couldn’t really see me because of that pit cart and I don’t know if he kind of glanced away or what, but when he looked back, I was just right there and couldn’t go anywhere. Its kind of a combination of, I guess, both of us could take fault in that. But our team did an amazing job of fixing quite a bit of damage (to the right rear). I love seeing my crew chief (Alan Gustafson) get in there and get dirty, but not for that reason. And, that practice went a little bit better than the other one. So, we’re gaining on it. I don’t want to say it can’t get worse, but I know it can. So, I’m not going to say that. But hopefully this will all pay off for us tomorrow.”

Final practice

Race

First half

Start

The race was scheduled to start at 1:45 p.m., but the threat of inclement weather prompted NASCAR to move the start up to 1:35. It started at 1:38 when Carl Edwards led the field to the green flag. By lap 20, teammate Kyle Busch ran him down, passed him going into turn 3 to take the lead. Debris in turn 1 brought out the first caution of the race on lap 22. Most of the field ninth on back opted to pit under the caution.

The race restarted on lap 27. By lap 64, Brad Keselowski ran down the leader to within half a second. He went underneath Kyle Busch going into turn 1 to take the lead on lap 68. Carl Edwards was the first of the eight drivers that didn't pit under the first caution to hit pit road at lap 77. He was followed by Jamie McMurray on lap 78 and David Ragan on lap 79. Matt Kenseth hit pit road on lap 81. Kurt Busch pitted from fourth on lap 82. Joey Logano, Denny Hamlin, Kyle Busch and Jimmie Johnson rounded out the pit cycle. Matt Kenseth was tagged for speeding on pit road and was forced to serve a drive-through penalty.

Second quarter
The cars that pitted under the first caution started pitting on lap 87. Brad Keselowski surrendered the lead to pit on lap 88 and handed the lead to Dale Earnhardt Jr. He pitted the next lap and handed the lead to teammate Jeff Gordon. He pitted on lap 91 and handed the lead to A. J. Allmendinger. Debris in turn 1 brought out the second caution of the race on lap 96. The debris was the right-front tire on the No. 7 of Alex Bowman catching fire as he was exiting his pit stall. Allmendinger, low on fuel, was forced to pit from the lead under caution and the lead cycled back to Keselowski. Justin Allgaier was tagged for removing equipment out of the pit box. Sam Hornish Jr. was tagged for too many members of his pit crew being over the wall. Kyle Larson was tagged for speeding on pit road. All restarted the race from the tail end of the field.

The race restarted on lap 108. Debris on the front stretch brought out the third caution of the race on lap 117. Carl Edwards was the only driver in the top ten that opted to pit under the caution.

Second half

Halfway
The race restarted on lap 122. Ryan Blaney was running ninth when he made an unscheduled stop for a loose right-rear tire on lap 130. Adding insult to injury, he was tagged for speeding entering pit road and was forced to serve a drive-through penalty. Kurt Busch started a wave of green flag stops pitting from fifth on lap 171. Kevin Harvick pitted from second on lap 176. Brad Keselowski pitted from the lead on lap 179 and handed it to teammate Joey Logano. Jimmie Johnson was tagged for speeding on pit road and was forced to serve a drive-through penalty. Debris in turn 2 brought out the fourth caution of the race on lap 189. J. J. Yeley's car blew up in smoke. Logano pitted from the lead and it cycled back to teammate Brad Keselowski.

The race restarted on lap 194. Keselowski lost the lead to Kevin Harvick rounding turns 1 and 2 and took the lead on lap 195. Paul Menard was running eleventh when he made contact with Kasey Kahne. He missed pit road the first time around on lap 199 and spun out trying to get onto pit road the next lap. This brought out the fifth caution of the race on lap 200.

The race restarted on lap 204. Clint Bowyer made contact with the turn 2 wall and cut down his right-rear tire with 93 laps to go. Justin Allgaier also had what appeared to be a right-front tire rub with 90 laps to go. Eventually, NASCAR called him to pit road with 88 laps to go. It turns out the smoke was engine related. Oil in turn 2 brought out the sixth caution of the race with 50 laps to go. That oil was from Yeley. Kyle Busch opted not to pit under the caution and assumed the lead.

Fourth quarter

The race restarted with 44 laps to go. Kyle Busch jumped to a two-second lead over Brad Keselowski. With five laps to go, Keselowski cut the lead to half a second. He bobbled exiting turn 4 with two to go and Kyle Busch drove off to his third win of the season after Alex Bowman brought out the seventh caution of the race on the final lap.

Post-race

Driver comments
"We've got to keep doing our deal," said Busch. "Every week it keeps getting better and better." “We had a really fast car and led a lot of laps,” Keselowski said. “I’m really proud of the team for bringing me two fast cars these past two weekends. It’s a joy to drive cars that fast.” “It was hot out there. It was fun,” Dale Earnhardt Jr. explained. “The car didn't really drive that great. We tried to get it better during the race. We had some engine issues. I saw some stuff with the gauges that were way off. We were getting beat down the straightaway all day, even by the Hendrick stuff. Guys will go back and see what's wrong.”

Heat and humidity
Following the race, Michael Annett and Matt DiBenedetto were transported to the infield care center after showing signs of heat exhaustion and in need of fluids. A. J. Allmendinger was also treated for strep throat. "Everyone is working real hard inside the cars," said Dale Earnhardt Jr. "This is a track where you got to drive real hard every lap. The corners don't work for you to where you can kind of settle into a pace. Just good thing they didn't call any red flags - we would have had some heat strokes out there."

Race results

Race statistics
9 lead changes among 7 different drivers
7 cautions for 34 laps
Time of race: 2 hours, 56 minutes, 6 seconds
Average speed: 
Kyle Busch took home $276,431 in winnings

Race awards
 Coors Light Pole Award: Carl Edwards (28.179)
 3M Lap Leader: Brad Keselowski (100 laps)
 American Ethanol Green Flag Restart Award: Kyle Busch
 Duralast Brakes "Bake In The Race" Award: Kyle Busch
 Freescale "Wide Open": Kevin Harvick
 Ingersoll Rand Power Move: David Gilliland (2 positions)
 MAHLE Clevite Engine Builder of the Race: Roush-Yates Engines, #2
 Mobil 1 Driver of the Race: Kyle Busch (137.2 driver rating)
 Moog Steering and Suspension Problem Solver of The Race: Austin Dillon (crew chief Richard Labbe (0.003 seconds))
 NASCAR Sprint Cup Leader Bonus: No winner: rolls over to $160,000 at next event
 Sherwin-Williams Fastest Lap: Kyle Busch (Lap 5, 29.166)
 Sunoco Rookie of The Race: Brett Moffitt

Media

Television
NBC Sports covered the race. Rick Allen, Jeff Burton – the all-time wins leader at New Hampshire Motor Speedway with four victories – and Steve Letarte had the call in the booth for the race. Dave Burns, Mike Massaro, Marty Snider and Kelli Stavast handled pit road for the television side.

Radio
PRN had the radio call for the race, which was simulcast on Sirius XM NASCAR Radio. Doug Rice, Mark Garrow and Wendy Venturini called the race from the booth when the field was racing down the front stretch. Rob Albright called the race from a billboard outside turn 2 when the field was racing through turns 1 & 2. Pat Patterson called the race from atop the turn 4 stands when the field was racing through turns 3 & 4. Brad Gillie, Brett McMillan, Jim Noble and Steve Richards worked pit road for the radio side.

Standings after the race

Drivers' Championship standings

Manufacturers' Championship standings

Note: Only the first sixteen positions are included for the driver standings.

References

External links

5-hour Energy 301
5-hour Energy 301
NASCAR races at New Hampshire Motor Speedway